Silver Spirit is a luxury cruise ship operated by Silversea Cruises. The sixth ship of the Silversea fleet, she entered service in 2009.

Description
Silver Spirit is fitted with 270 ocean-view suites, the  suites of the fleet. She also features six different restaurants, an  spa, and a supper club with live music, dancing and night-club style entertainment.

On 23 December 2009, Silver Spirit departed on her maiden voyage from Barcelona, Spain to Lisbon, Portugal. Following this sailing, she undertook her maiden transatlantic voyage from Lisbon to Ft. Lauderdale, Florida.
On 21 January 2010, Silver Spirit embarked on her inaugural transoceanic voyage, a 91-day voyage around America. Red Sea Cruises is chartering the ship for summer 2020.

Dry dock 
In spring 2018, Silver Spirit underwent significant renovation. In a two-month refurbishment the ship was cut in half and an additional section was added. She grew from 195.8 to 210.7 meters long. Her tonnage increased from 36,009 to 39,519 GT, and capacity - from 540 to 608 passengers.

References

Notes

Bibliography

External links

Silversea Cruises – official site
Silversea: Silver Cloud – Silversea official site page about the ship

2009 ships
Ships built by Fincantieri
Ships built in Ancona